The Living Room Tour is a live album by Carole King released in 2005. It consists of live recordings of most of the songs from Tapestry. Her daughters Louise and Sherry and background singer and guitarist Gary Burr joined her on several songs. This album debuted at #17 in the US, becoming King's highest-charting album since 1977. That was largely due to television advertisements and that it was available in Starbucks retailers.

For the week of July 18, 2005, it was the #1 album on Amazon, and it was the #2 album of July 2005 on Amazon. In its first week, The Living Room Tour sold 44,000 copies in the United States, and has since sold over 330,000 copies in the United States.

In August 2006, the album re-entered the Billboard 200 at #151, because it was once again available in all Starbucks locations in the US.

Track listing
All songs written by Carole King (except where noted).

Disc one
"Welcome To My Living Room" – 1:58
"Peace in the Valley"  (King, Toni Stern) – 3:42
"Love Makes the World" (King, Sam Hollander, Dave Schommer) – 4:23
"Now and Forever" – 3:18
"Where You Lead I Will Follow" (King, Toni Stern) – 3:24
 Duet with her daughter, Louise Goffin
"Lay Down My Life" – 4:20
"Jazzman" (King, Dave Palmer) – 4:00
"Smackwater Jack" (Gerry Goffin, King) – 4:12
"Wishful Thinking" – 4:12
"Medley: "Take Good Care of My Baby/"It Might As Well Rain Until September"/"Go Away Little Girl"/"I'm into Something Good"/"Hey Girl"/"One Fine Day"/"Will You Love Me Tomorrow" (Goffin, King) – 8:39

Disc two
"Loving You Forever" (King, Gary Burr) – 3:32
"It's Too Late" (King, Stern) – 5:22
"So Far Away" – 4:52
"Sweet Seasons" (King, Stern) – 3:21
"Chains" (Goffin, King) – 4:09
"Pleasant Valley Sunday" (Goffin, King) – 3:45
"Being At War With Each Other" – 4:05
"I Feel The Earth Move" – 4:04
"(You Make Me Feel Like) A Natural Woman" (Goffin, King, Jerry Wexler) – 3:58
 Duet with her daughter, Sherry Goffin Kondor.
"You've Got a Friend" – 5:32
"The Locomotion" (Goffin, King) – 3:38

Personnel
 Carole King – vocals, piano, guitar
 Rudy Guess – vocals, guitar, bass guitar
 Gary Burr – vocals, guitar, bass
 Louise Goffin – vocals on "Where You Lead I Will Follow"
 Sherry Goffin Kondor – vocals on "A Natural Woman"

Charts

Tour

References

Carole King live albums
2005 live albums
Albums recorded at the Greek Theatre (Los Angeles)